Jouko Jokinen (born 30 November 1936) is a Finnish speed skater. He competed at the 1960 Winter Olympics and the 1964 Winter Olympics.

References

External links
 

1936 births
Living people
Finnish male speed skaters
Olympic speed skaters of Finland
Speed skaters at the 1960 Winter Olympics
Speed skaters at the 1964 Winter Olympics
People from Rovaniemi
Sportspeople from Lapland (Finland)